The 1949 Campeonato Nacional de Fútbol Profesional was Chilean first tier’s 17th season. Universidad Católica were the champions, winning their first ever league title.

Scores

Standings

Topscorer

References

External links
ANFP 
RSSSF Chile 1949

Primera División de Chile seasons
Primera
Chile